Ain Ehel Taya  is a town and commune in the Adrar Region of Mauritania.

In 2000 it had a population of 5,653.

References

External links
Official site

Communes of Adrar Region